Riya Suman is an Indian actress who appears mainly in Tamil and Telugu films. She debuted in the commercially successful 2016 Telugu film Majnu.

Career 
Riya made her debut in Majnu (2016) opposite Nani. The movie opened to great reviews commercially and critically. She later starred in Paper Boy (2018), which opened to mixed reviews from the critics and audience. She received critical appraisal for her rich yet humble girl portrayal and nuanced performance in the film. The Hans Indias critic wrote, "Riya Suman delivered an elegant and beautiful performance. She is not only looking extremely gorgeous in the film but will impress the viewers with her talent as well." The IndiaGlitz critic wrote, "Riya Suman is restrained; her smile comes with a certain cuteness." Telugu Film Nagars writer praised the film, writing, "Matured measured performance by Riya Suman." The Telugu Cinema''' writer's review said, "Riya Suman shows grace and has a decent screen presence."

Riya's first film in Tamil, titled Seeru'' (2020), with Jiiva, was directed by Rathna Siva.

Filmography

References

External links 
 
Riya Suman on Facebook 
Riya Suman on Instagram
Riya Suman on Twitter

Living people
Indian film actresses
Actresses in Telugu cinema
Actresses in Tamil cinema
21st-century Indian actresses
Year of birth missing (living people)